Søverhøi is a mountain in Skjåk Municipality in Innlandet county, Norway. The mountain is surrounded by several other notable mountains including Dyringshøi to the northeast; Leirvasshøi to the northwest; Tverreggi, Sprongeggi and Rivenoskulen to the southwest; and Tverrådalskyrkja and Tundradalskyrkja to the south.

See also
List of mountains of Norway

References

Skjåk
Mountains of Innlandet